Agunpakhi (English: The Phoenix)  is a novel by Bangladeshi writer Hasan Azizul Huq. First published in 2006, the novel was awarded Prothom Alo book of the year prize in 2007 and Ananda Purashkar in 2008.

Plot summary
Agunpakhi is set in rural Rarh, now in West Bengal, of early twentieth century. It chronicles a rural family's ups and downs. The story is told by a country housewife in first person narrative. The story begins a score years before the Partition of India. She makes a powerful observation of herself and people around her. Through her eyes, we see the way of life of the then Rarh region.

In the early part of the novel, she mostly speaks of life within the family: births, deaths, marriages. Their fortunes blossom as they become the largest landowner in the area. But as World War II breaks out, they get hit by cholera, shortages, crop failure, and finally the trauma of Hindu-Muslim division. With these events, the story transcends its domestic confinement.

The narrator comments on her world being consumed by a divisiveness that had nothing to do with their lives. At the end of the novel, her children set for Pakistan, and later they ask their parents to join them. Her husband agrees, but she refuses to go. Her decision to stay back alone astonishes her husband. In answer to her husband's question, “When did you learn so much?” she says, “All these years I've only learned what you taught me and I've only said what you had me say. Now though, I've learned one or two things on my own.”

References

Bengali-language novels
2006 novels
Historical novels
Novels set in West Bengal
Bangladeshi books
Bengali-language literature
Bangladeshi novels